John Vivian Everard (born 24 November 1956) is a British former diplomat. He was formerly the UK's ambassador to Belarus, the UK's ambassador to Uruguay and the UK's ambassador to North Korea from 2006 to 2008, after which he was the holder of the Pantech fellowship at the Shorenstein Asia–Pacific Research Center at Stanford University in 2010 and 2011.

Early life and education
Born in Newcastle upon Tyne to William Ralph Everard and Margaret Nora Jennifer Everard, Everard holds BA and MA degrees in Chinese from Emmanuel College at Cambridge University, and a diploma in economics from Beijing University. Everard also earned an MBA from Manchester Business School.

Career
Everard was appointed the Coordinator of the United Nations Panel of Experts on sanctions against North Korea established by United Nations Security Council Resolution 1874 in March 2011 and withdrew from that position in November 2012.

Personal life
Everard is proficient in Chinese, Spanish, German, Russian and French. Everard is a cyclist. He was a trustee of the Youth Hostels Association of England and Wales from 2009 to 2010.

Everard married Heather Ann Starkey in 1990; they live in London.

Books
 Only Beautiful, Please: A British Diplomat in North Korea, Asia–Pacific Research Center, 18 June 2012.

References

1956 births
Living people
People educated at The King's School, Chester
People educated at King Edward VI School, Lichfield
Alumni of Emmanuel College, Cambridge
Peking University alumni
Ambassadors of the United Kingdom to Belarus
Ambassadors of the United Kingdom to North Korea
Ambassadors of the United Kingdom to Uruguay
British writers
British diplomats in China